The 2019 CFL season was the 66th season of modern-day Canadian football. Officially, it was the 62nd Canadian Football League season. The regular season began on June 13 and concluded with the playing of the 107th Grey Cup in Calgary on November 24 —where the Winnipeg Blue Bombers defeated the Hamilton Tiger-Cats 33–12 to win their first Grey Cup since 1990.

League business

International partnerships
In October 2018, the CFL began work on an initiative known as "CFL 2.0" to grow its revenues and broaden its international reach outside of Canada and the United States. This included establishing partnerships with other gridiron football leagues (including using them as a potential farm system for Canadian player development post-university), international combines, scouting international prospects to join Canadian university football programs, expansion of the international media presence of the league, as well as increased investments in amateur football programs in Canada.

On November 23, 2018, the CFL and the Professional American Football League of Mexico (LFA) signed a non-binding letter of intent on various partnerships, which included projects such as the possibility of hosting a regular season game in Mexico. On January 9, 2019, it was announced that the CFL and its franchises had committed to investing $4 million in supporting amateur football programs in Canada in 2019.

On January 31 the CFL and German Football League (GFL) signed an agreement to form a long-term strategic partnership. The partnership included the participation of German athletes at the 2019 CFL Combine. In February 2019, the CFL reached similar agreements with the Ligue Élite de Football Américain (France), the Austrian American Football Federation, the Federazione Italiana di American Football (Italy), and with football officials in Finland, Norway, Sweden and Denmark. In July, the league also partnered with the British American Football Association.

New collective bargaining agreement
The five-year agreement that was ratified between the CFL and CFL Players' Association in 2013 was set to expire just prior to the start of this season, on the first day of scheduled training camp, May 19. On May 15 the CFL and CFL Players' Association announced they had reached a tentative agreement on a new three-year collective bargaining agreement, which was ratified by players and approved by the league's Board of Governors a week later on May 22; four days before the first preseason game. The length of the agreement aligns with Bell Media's media rights to the league.

The main components of the CBA included:

Financial

 $50,000 increase in the team salary cap each season.  For the 2019 season, the salary cap will be $5,250,000 (average of $114,130 per active roster spot)
 The minimum salary remained at $54,000 for the 2019 season, but will increase to $65,000 in 2020 and 2021
 Players receiving a 20% share of all future revenue tied to the CFL 2.0 initiative.
 The CFL will not be allowed to withhold bonus payments in the lead up to the expiration of the new CBA

Roster composition 

 Each team has one global player designated roster spot starting in 2019, increasing to two slots in 2020
 Canadian quarterbacks now count towards the national roster ratio, otherwise the national-international ratio remained unchanged
 To protect veteran American players and build continuity - three of the starting American players have to have played for their current team for at least three seasons, or four seasons in the league for any team

Player safety 

 Medical coverage for up to three years for injured players
 The number of padded practices in training camp was reduced from 10 in 2018, to five in 2019 and then down to only three in 2020

Other 

 Work permits for American players are open, allowing them to seek employment in Canada during the off-season
 Pending free agents may talk with any team for nine days in advance of opening of free agency

Football operations cap
On June 5, 2018, it was reported that the CFL had approved a limit on football operations staff salaries and number of coaches and operations staff employed by each team. In this report, the number of coaches on each team would not exceed 11 and the number of other football operations staff may not exceed 17. The total compensation of those 28 staff members would be capped at $2,738,000. As of the 2018 CFL season, four teams had more than 11 coaches employed and would be directly impacted by these changes. Consequently, there was talk of a potential coaches union being formed to combat the unilateral decision.

On December 6, 2018, the league formally announced the cap regulations, with the total compensation of the combined 11 coaches and 14 other football operations staff being set at $2,588,000 for 2019 and 2020. Similar to the player salary cap, violations in excess of $100,000 would result in monetary fines and loss of draft picks. However, as teams adjust to the new rules for 2019, they may self-report violations to avoid personal fines and loss of draft picks.

Montreal Alouettes ownership
On May 31 Robert Wetenhall surrendered his ownership of the Montreal Alouettes back to the league, after having pursued a sale of the franchise for several months. The CFL intended to continue this process, but would operate the team on its behalf.

New outfitter 
On September 12, 2018, it was announced that New Era would be the official outfitter of all CFL teams beginning in the 2019 season. This came as a result of the previous supplier, Adidas, not renewing their contract following the 2018 expiry of their previous deal. New Era Cap had been a licensee of the CFL for headwear and apparel since January 2011, and it was the first time that the company provided football uniforms and sideline apparel.

While most teams maintained relatively similar uniforms, the Montreal Alouettes unveiled a revamped identity with new logos and uniforms on February 1, while the B.C. Lions returned to using their normal logo on their helmets rather than a stylized version.

Player movement

International drafts 
The CFL and LFA hosted a combine in Mexico City on January 13 attended by 51 top Mexican players. The following day, 27 players were selected in a CFL–LFA Draft; the Edmonton Eskimos held the first overall pick, and selected Diego Viamontes of Mayas CDMX.

On April 11, the CFL held its first European draft in which nine players were drafted, one to each CFL team: four of the players were from France, three from Germany, and one each from Italy and Finland.

Free agency
The free agency period began on February 12 at noon EST. All players eligible for free agency are unrestricted free agents, as is customary in the league. Notable signings in the period included:

Trade deadline
The in-season trade deadline was on October 9 at 3:59 pm EDT.

Johnny Manziel 
On February 27, Johnny Manziel, a quarterback for the Montreal Alouettes in 2018, was permanently banned from playing on any CFL team as a result of what the Alouettes called an unspecified "(contravention of) the agreement which made him eligible to play." Manziel has denied any wrongdoing but accepted the banishment, stating he would consider playing options in the United States; he then signed on with the Alliance of American Football who were partly through their inaugural season.

Coaching changes

Rule changes
In March the CFL's Rules Committee submitted a variety of rule changes to the Board of Governors, to be implemented for the 2019 season. As had been the case in previous years the proposed changes once again focused on improving game flow and increasing player safety. The proposals were reviewed and accepted by the CFL's Board of Governors on April 10.

 Allowing the Command Centre to assist referees with called and non-called roughing-the-passer infractions including instances where an obvious roughing-the-passer infraction was not called because a referee's view was blocked.
 The ability for the Command Centre to upgrade a 15-yard roughing-the-passer penalty to a 25-yard penalty for a direct blow to the quarterback's head or neck with the helmet when that player has a clear view to the quarterback, and there are no mitigating circumstances such as a quarterback ducking his head.
 Allowing the Command Centre to assist on-field officials in calling penalties when the injury spotter has intervened in a player safety situation.
 Allowing the Command Centre to assist on-field officials with called and non-called roughing-the-kicker infractions.
 Removing the stipulation that allows a defender to contact a kicker's plant leg without penalty if the defender has touched the ball prior to contact.
 Clarifying the definition of spearing to be when a player uses the top of their helmet as the primary point of contact to deliver a blow to an opponent.
 Making the use of three or more wedge blockers on kicking plays illegal.
 Making it illegal for a defensive player to deliver a forcible blow to the long snapper while the snapper's head is down and they are in a vulnerable position and unable to protect themselves.
 Whistling a play dead any time a quarterback carrying the ball gives themselves up by sliding with any part of their body. Previously, a quarterback could only "give themselves up" by sliding feet-first.
 Coaches are entitled to a second challenge if their first is successful, giving them a potential maximum of two per game instead of just one.
 A 10-yard objectionable-conduct penalty assessed for faking or embellishing contact, otherwise known as diving.
 Spearing on any player upgraded to a 25-yard penalty by the Command Centre when a spear is delivered to the head or neck, the player has a clear view to the opponent and there are no mitigating circumstances such as the player ducking into what would otherwise be legal contact.
 If a player receives two 25-yard penalties in the same game, they are disqualified from that game.
 A kicked or thrown football remains a live ball instead of becoming a dead ball when it touches a goal-post ribbon.

Regular season

Schedule 
The regular season schedule was announced on December 20, 2018, and was played over 21 weeks from June 13 to November 12, 2019. There was an increase in Saturday primetime games with 7:00 p.m. ET kickoffs, appearing in all but one week of the season. Only three games were played on Sundays, and three were played on Mondays.

Highlights of the schedule included:

 The season opener featured the Hamilton Tiger-Cats hosting the Saskatchewan Roughriders, with Hamilton winning 27–13. A rematch of the 106th Grey Cup also occurred in week 1, with the Calgary Stampeders hosting the Ottawa Redblacks.
 Canada Day game: The Roughriders hosted the Toronto Argonauts on July 1, winning 32–7.
 Touchdown Atlantic: On August 25, the CFL played a regular season game in the Maritimes for the first time since 2013, featuring the Montreal Alouettes and Toronto Argonauts. The game was presented by Schooners Sports and Entertainment (SSE), the group that is attempting to be awarded an expansion franchise as the Atlantic Schooners. The location of the game was narrowed down three choices: Halifax, Moncton, and Antigonish, Nova Scotia. Although SSE was expected to announce the location of the game before the end of January 2019, the announcement was not made until the end of March, at which time Croix-Bleue Medavie Stadium (Université de Moncton) in Moncton was selected.
Labour Day Classic: Three traditional rivalry games were played over Labour Day weekend, including the Saskatchewan Roughriders hosting the Winnipeg Blue Bombers, the Hamilton Tiger-Cats hosting the Toronto Argonauts, and the Calgary Stampeders hosting the Edmonton Eskimos.

For the first time in league history, no games were played on Thanksgiving.

In the late evening of August 9 at 9:06 pm EDT, a weather delay was declared at Percival Molson Memorial Stadium in Montreal due to an approaching thunderstorm with intense lightning; the Saskatchewan Roughriders were leading the Alouettes 17–10 with 2:41 left in the 3rd quarter. Because the game had not restarted by 10:06 pm EDT and over 7:30 had been played in the 3rd at that point, the 17–10 score was declared final.

Standings
Teams in bold are in playoff positions.

Results

Attendance

CFL Playoffs

The Grey Cup was played at McMahon Stadium in Calgary, Alberta, on November 24.  The Winnipeg Blue Bombers won their first Grey Cup championship in 29 years, ending the longest current championship drought in the Canadian Football League.  Winnipeg native, Andrew Harris was named both the Grey Cup Most Valuable Player and Grey Cup Most Valuable Canadian.  This was the first time that a player won both awards in the Grey Cup championship.

Playoff bracket

Award winners

CFL Top Performers of the Week

Source

CFL Top Performers of the Month

Source

2019 CFL All-Stars

Offence 
QB – Cody Fajardo, Saskatchewan Roughriders
RB – William Stanback, Montreal Alouettes
R – Brandon Banks, Hamilton Tiger-Cats
R – Reggie Begelton, Calgary Stampeders
R – Bryan Burnham, BC Lions
R – Shaq Evans, Saskatchewan Roughriders
R – Bralon Addison, Hamilton Tiger–Cats
OT – Stanley Bryant, Winnipeg Blue Bombers
OT – Chris Van Zeyl, Hamilton Tiger–Cats
OG – Shane Bergman, Calgary Stampeders
OG – Brandon Revenberg, Hamilton Tiger-Cats
C – Dan Clark, Saskatchewan Roughriders

Defence 
DT – Dylan Wynn, Hamilton Tiger-Cats
DT – Almondo Sewell, Edmonton Eskimos
DE – Willie Jefferson, Winnipeg Blue Bombers
DE – Charleston Hughes, Saskatchewan Roughriders
LB – Simoni Lawrence, Hamilton Tiger-Cats
LB – Hénoc Muamba, Montreal Alouettes
CLB – Derrick Moncrief, Saskatchewan Roughriders
CB – Tre Roberson,  Calgary Stampeders
CB – Winston Rose, Winnipeg Blue Bombers
HB – Greg Reid, Montreal Alouettes
HB – Richard Leonard, Hamilton Tiger-Cats
S – Tunde Adeleke, Hamilton Tiger–Cats

Special teams 
K – Sergio Castillo, BC Lions
P – Richie Leone, Ottawa Redblacks
ST – Frankie Williams, Hamilton Tiger–Cats

Source

2019 CFL Western All-Stars

Offence 
QB – Cody Fajardo, Saskatchewan Roughriders
RB – Andrew Harris, Winnipeg Blue Bombers
R – Bryan Burnham, BC Lions
R – Reggie Begelton, Calgary Stampeders
R – Shaq Evans, Saskatchewan Roughriders
R – Greg Ellingson, Edmonton Eskimos
R – Eric Rogers, Calgary Stampeders
OT – Stanley Bryant, Winnipeg Blue Bombers
OT – Derek Dennis, Calgary Stampeders
OG – Shane Bergman, Calgary Stampeders
OG – Matt O'Donnell, Edmonton Eskimos
C – Dan Clark, Saskatchewan Roughriders

Defence 
DT – Almondo Sewell, Edmonton Eskimos
DT – Mike Moore, Edmonton Eskimos
DE – Willie Jefferson, Winnipeg Blue Bombers
DE – Charleston Hughes, Saskatchewan Roughriders
LB – Solomon Elimimian, Saskatchewan Roughriders
LB – Larry Dean, Edmonton Eskimos
CLB – Derrick Moncrief, Saskatchewan Roughriders
CB – Tre Roberson,  Calgary Stampeders
CB – Winston Rose, Winnipeg Blue Bombers
HB – Marcus Sayles, Winnipeg Blue Bombers
HB – DaShaun Amos, Calgary Stampeders
S – Mike Edem, Saskatchewan Roughriders

Special teams 
K – Sergio Castillo, BC Lions
P – Jon Ryan, Saskatchewan Roughriders
ST – Mike Miller, Winnipeg Blue Bombers

Source

2019 CFL Eastern All-Stars

Offence 
QB – Vernon Adams Jr., Montreal Alouettes 
RB – William Stanback, Montreal Alouettes
R – Brandon Banks, Hamilton Tiger-Cats
R – Bralon Addison, Hamilton Tiger–Cats
R – Derel Walker, Toronto Argonauts
R – Geno Lewis, Montreal Alouettes
R – S. J. Green, Toronto Argonauts
OT – Chris Van Zeyl, Hamilton Tiger–Cats
OT – Ryker Mathews, Hamilton Tiger–Cats
OG – Brandon Revenberg, Hamilton Tiger-Cats
OG – Nolan MacMillan, Ottawa Redblacks
C – Kristian Matte, Montreal Alouettes

Defence 
DT – Dylan Wynn, Hamilton Tiger-Cats
DT – Cleyon Laing, Toronto Argonauts
DE – Ja'Gared Davis, Hamilton Tiger–Cats
DE – John Bowman, Montreal Alouettes
LB – Simoni Lawrence, Hamilton Tiger-Cats
LB – Hénoc Muamba, Montreal Alouettes
CLB – Patrick Levels, Montreal Alouettes
CB – Tommie Campbell, Montreal Alouettes 
CB – Delvin Breaux, Hamilton Tiger-Cats
HB – Greg Reid, Montreal Alouettes
HB – Richard Leonard, Hamilton Tiger-Cats
S – Tunde Adeleke, Hamilton Tiger–Cats

Special teams 
K – Lirim Hajrullahu, Hamilton Tiger-Cats
P – Richie Leone, Ottawa Redblacks
ST – Frankie Williams, Hamilton Tiger–Cats

2019 CFL Awards
 CFL's Most Outstanding Player Award – Brandon Banks (WR), Hamilton Tiger-Cats
 CFL's Most Outstanding Canadian Award – Henoc Muamba (LB), Montreal Alouettes
 CFL's Most Outstanding Defensive Player Award – Willie Jefferson (DE), Winnipeg Blue Bombers
 CFL's Most Outstanding Offensive Lineman Award – Chris Van Zeyl, (OL), Hamilton Tiger-Cats
 CFL's Most Outstanding Rookie Award – Nate Holley (LB), Calgary Stampeders
 John Agro Special Teams Award – Frankie Williams (DB), Hamilton Tiger-Cats
 Tom Pate Memorial Award – Rob Maver (P), Calgary Stampeders
 Jake Gaudaur Veterans' Trophy – Martin Bédard (LS), Montreal Alouettes
 Annis Stukus Trophy – Orlondo Steinauer, Hamilton Tiger-Cats
 Commissioner's Award – Jim Lawson, chairman of the CFL's Board of Governors
 Hugh Campbell Distinguished Leadership Award – John Hufnagel
 Jane Mawby Tribute Award - Ross Folan, director of video operations, Calgary Stampeders

Broadcasting 
The 2019 season marked the 11th of the CFL's exclusive Canadian media rights with Bell Media, covering TSN (English) and RDS (French).

On January 14, the league renewed its U.S. broadcast deal with TSN's minority partner ESPN, which expired after the 2018 season; it included 20 games on ESPN's linear networks, and all remaining games carried on ESPN+.  Prior to renewing with ESPN, it had been speculated that the league was courting NFL Network, which carried the league's games in 2010 and 2011; that network requested a significant change in the schedule that would have moved the season opener to an earlier date in order to secure carriage, which the league indicated could not happen without a new CBA.   The league also entered a deal with MVS Comunicaciones which saw MVS broadcasting a CFL ‘Game of the Week’ beginning with the Week 1 of the regular season through until the end of the regular season on November 2.

The league continued to make games available to fans outside of major broadcast areas via CFL Game Pass, a service that streamed games over the internet to regions not covered by major broadcasters. In partnership with Yare Media, the CFL internet streaming service added a number of new territories.  Additional countries included Argentina, Australia, Brazil, Chile, Columbia, New Zealand, Peru and all of Africa.

References

Canadian Football League seasons
2019 in Canadian football